is a passenger railway station on the Keihin-Tohoku Line in Urawa-ku, Saitama, Saitama Prefecture, Japan, operated by East Japan Railway Company (JR East).

Lines

Layout
The station has one island platform serving two tracks, connected by a footbridge to the elevated station building. The station is staffed.

Platforms

History 
The station opened on 1 November 1912. The station became part of the JR East network after the privatization of the JNR on 1 April 1987.

Passenger statistics 
In fiscal 2019, the station was used by an average of 26,802 passengers daily (boarding passengers only).

Surrounding area 
Saitama City Chuo-ku Ward Office
Urawanishi High School

See also
List of railway stations in Japan

References

External links

JR East station information 

Railway stations in Saitama Prefecture
Keihin-Tōhoku Line
Railway stations in Japan opened in 1912
Railway stations in Saitama (city)